Pleurotomella packardii is a species of sea snail, a marine gastropod mollusk in the family Raphitomidae.

Type species of the genus.

Subspecies
 Pleurotomella packardii packardii Verrill, A.E., 1872
 Pleurotomella packardii benedicti Verrill, A.E. & S.I. Smith, 1884

Description
The shell size varies between 15 mm and 22 mm

(Original description) The shell is thin, fragile, translucent, pale flesh-colored, moderately stout, with an acute, somewhat turreted spine. It contains 9 whorls. The 2½ whorls of the protoconch are nearly smooth, regular, convex and chestnut-colored. The subsequent whorls are shouldered, strongly convex in the middle, but with a smooth concave band below the suture, corresponding to the posterior notch in the outer lip. The whorls are crossed below the subsutural band by about 16 strong, prominent, rounded, somewhat oblique ribs, most prominent on the middle of the whorl, but not angulated. On the body whorl these ribs become very oblique below the middle and follow the curve of the edge of the lip, nearly fading out anteriorly. The surface between the ribs is marked by faint growth lines  and by fine, unequal, slightly raised revolving lines, which pass over the ribs without interruption. They become more evident on the lower part of the body whorl and are very faint on the subsutural band, which is more decidedly marked by receding, strongly curved growth lines. The aperture is rather broad above, elongated blow, suboval. The outer lip is very thin, sharp, prominent above separated from the preceding whorl by a wide and very deep sinus, extending back for about one fifth of the circumference of the whorl. The anterior border of the lip is incurved near the end and obliquely truncate, forming a short, straight siphonal canal. The simple columella is nearly straight, its inner edge toward the end, sharp and obliquely recurved. 

The absence of eyes and operculum, great size of the posterior sinus, and character of the apex, indicate that this shell represents a new genus, which I purpose to call Pleurotomella.

Distribution
This species occurs in the bathyal northwest Atlantic Ocean and in the Gulf of Maine.

References

 Turgeon, D.; Quinn, J.F.; Bogan, A.E.; Coan, E.V.; Hochberg, F.G.; Lyons, W.G.; Mikkelsen, P.M.; Neves, R.J.; Roper, C.F.E.; Rosenberg, G.; Roth, B.; Scheltema, A.; Thompson, F.G.; Vecchione, M.; Williams, J.D. (1998). Common and scientific names of aquatic invertebrates from the United States and Canada: mollusks. 2nd ed. American Fisheries Society Special Publication, 26. American Fisheries Society: Bethesda, MD (USA). . IX, 526 + cd-rom pp.
 Sysoev A.V. (2014). Deep-sea fauna of European seas: An annotated species check-list of benthic invertebrates living deeper than 2000 m in the seas bordering Europe. Gastropoda. Invertebrate Zoology. Vol.11. No.1: 134–155

External links
 Gastropods.com: Pleurotomella packardii packardii
 Verrill A. E. (1884). Second catalogue of mollusca recently added to the fauna of the New England Coast and the adjacent parts of the Atlantic, consisting mostly of deep sea species, with notes on others previously recorded. Transactions of the Connecticut Academy of Arts and Sciences, 6(1): 139-294, pl. 28-32
 
 Dautzenberg P. & Fischer H. (1896). Dragages effectués par l'Hirondelle et par la Princesse Alice 1888-1895. 1. Mollusques Gastéropodes. Mémoires de la Société Zoologique de France. 9: 395-498, pl. 15-22
 Locard A. (1897-1898). Expéditions scientifiques du Travailleur et du Talisman pendant les années 1880, 1881, 1882 et 1883. Mollusques testacés. Paris, Masson. vol. 1 [1897, p. 1-516 pl. 1-22; vol. 2 [1898], p. 1-515, pl. 1-18]
  Serge GOFAS, Ángel A. LUQUE, Joan Daniel OLIVER,José TEMPLADO & Alberto SERRA (2021) - The Mollusca of Galicia Bank (NE Atlantic Ocean); European Journal of Taxonomy 785: 1–114
 

packardii
Gastropods described in 1872